The 2010 Manny V. Pangilinan Invitational Championships also known as the 2010 Smart Philippines Invitational Challenge, was a five-team basketball tournament hosted from June 24-27, 2010. The tournament, named after Filipino businessman and sportsman Manny V. Pangilinan, took place at the Ninoy Aquino Stadium.  The Philippine national team became champions beating Jordan in the finals.

Venue

Results 
The five teams participated in a round-robin elimination round with the top two team playing for the championships at the finals scheduled on June 27. The two teams from the PBA, Barangay Ginebra Kings and the Talk 'N Text Tropang Texters played no bearing games. Ginebra played two games and Talk 'N Text played just one. All the other teams played three games each in the first round.

Standings

Final

Awards

References 

2010
2009–10 in Asian basketball
2009–10 in Philippine basketball
2009–10 in Chinese basketball
Sports in Manila
2009–10 in Jordanian basketball